CM4 may refer to:
CM postcode area
Championship Manager 4
Raspberry Pi Compute Module 4